The knockout stage of the 2023 Leagues Cup is the second and final stage of the competition, following the group stage. Scheduled from August 2 to 19, the knockout stage will conclude with the final.

Format
The knockout stage of the 2023 Leagues Cup will be contested between 30 teams that qualified from the group stage and two that received a bye. Matches in the knockout stage are played to a finish. If the score of a match was level at the end of 90 minutes of playing time, extra time was played. If, after two periods of 15 minutes, the scores were still tied, the match was decided by a penalty shoot-out.

Qualified teams
The top two placed teams from each of the fifteen groups qualified for the knockout stage, joining LAFC and Pachuca, who received byes to this round.

Bye

Bracket

References

External links

2023 Leagues Cup